Cloey Uddenberg (born 13 November 2002) is a footballer who plays as a midfielder for Simcoe County Rovers FC. Born in Canada, she represents the Saint Kitts and Nevis women's national team.

University career
In 2020, she began attending the University of Guelph, playing for the women's soccer team. In her rookie season in 2021 (the 2020 season was cancelled due to the COVID-19 pandemic), she was OUA and U Sports Rookie of the Year, OUA West Player of the Year, and was named to the Second Team All-Canadian and U Sports All-Rookie team.

Club career
Uddenberg played for League1 Ontario side Aurora FC from 2017 to 2019. 

In 2021, she played for Guelph Union. She scored one goal on August 24, against Unionville Milliken SC.
In 2022, she joined Simcoe County Rovers FC. She was named a league First Team All-Star in 2022.

International career
Eligible for Canada and St. Kitts and Nevis, Uddenberg was encouraged to try out for the St. Kitts and Nevis team by her father.
 
Uddenberg represented St Kitts and Nevis at the 2020 CONCACAF Women's U-17 Championship qualifying stage and two CONCACAF Women's U-20 Championship qualifiers (2018 and 2019). 

She also represents the Saint Kitts and Nevis senior team. She scored a hat trick against Grenada on May 23, 2018 at the 2018 CONCACAF Women's Championship qualification. She scored another hat trick on October 8, 2019 against Antigua and Barbuda at the 2020 CONCACAF Women's Olympic Qualifying Championship qualification.

International goals
Scores and results list Saint Kitts and Nevis's goal tally first

Personal life
Uddenberg's paternal grandparents hail from Saint Kitts and Nevis. Her sisters, Kayla and Carley, are also members of the Saint Kitts and Nevis women's national football team.

References

2002 births
Living people
Citizens of Saint Kitts and Nevis through descent
Saint Kitts and Nevis women's footballers
Women's association football midfielders
Women's association football defenders
Saint Kitts and Nevis women's international footballers
Saint Kitts and Nevis people of Canadian descent
Sportspeople of Canadian descent
Sportspeople from Richmond Hill, Ontario
Soccer people from Ontario
Guelph Gryphons women's soccer players
League1 Ontario (women) players
Canadian people of Saint Kitts and Nevis descent
Sportspeople of Saint Kitts and Nevis descent
Aurora FC (Canada) players
Simcoe County Rovers FC players
Guelph Union players